Stuart Cameron may refer to:

 Stuart Cameron (town planner), academic at Newcastle University in the United Kingdom
 Stuart Cameron (musician), guitarist based in Toronto, Canada
 Stuart Cameron (footballer) (born 1964), Australian rules footballer
 Stuart John Cameron (born 1939), Canadian politician

See also
 Stewart Cameron (disambiguation)